Heimdall 2 (also known as Heimdall 2: into the Hall of Worlds) is an isometric action-adventure video game developed by The 8th Day and published by Core Design for Amiga, Amiga CD32 and DOS platforms in 1994. It is set in a world based on Norse mythology and is the sequel to Heimdall, released in 1991. The CD-ROM versions contain a CD audio soundtrack composed by Martin Iveson.

Reception
Amiga Computing rated the game 77%. The One Amiga gave the game 90%. Score gave the game 70%.

References

External links
 Heimdall 2 at MobyGames

Cancelled Sega CD games
1994 video games
Amiga games
Amiga CD32 games
Action-adventure games
DOS games
Video games developed in the United Kingdom
Video games with isometric graphics
Video games based on Norse mythology
Video games set in the Viking Age
Core Design games
Single-player video games